Qeshlaq Amir Khanlu-ye Qarah Saqqal (also Romanized as Qeshlāq Amīr Khānlū-ye Qarah Saqqāl) is a village in Mahmudabad Rural District, Tazeh Kand District, Parsabad County, Ardabil Province, Iran. At the 2006 census, its population was 121, in 25 families.

References 

Towns and villages in Parsabad County